Sindh Industrial and Trading Estate (SITE) located in Karachi still claimed to be one of the largest industrial estates in Asia due to its huge land size that is spread over 4,460 acres.

History
In order to promote industrialization and create attractive conditions for industrialists, the Government of Sindh established Sindh Industrial Trading Estates, in the year 1946. The object was to establish planned industrial areas where industrialists, in the future, could have all their required and needed facilities such as land, road, railway, water supply, electricity, gas, telephone, godowns (warehouses), sanitation, drainage, residential areas for workers and other necessary public amenities. These facilities were designed to create an industrial environment congenial for intending future industrialists.

Organizational structure
S.I.T.E established by virtue of policy decision through Sindh Government No.24-I.B/47.1, dated June 2, 1947. SITE is the Government department under Ministry of Commerce and Industry, Government of Sindh in Pakistan. 
The Company works through Board of Directors appointed by Government of Sindh and is accountable to the provincial government for its performance. It is also a non-profit organization of Pakistan.

There are a total of 10 industrial estates, each one of them called SITE, located in Karachi, Sindh and in other major cities of the province. Sindh Industrial and Trading Estate zone is providing employment to more than 1/2 million people. The objective and aim is to boost the industrialization in the province of Sindh.Companies located within SITE area

 Valika Textile Mills was the first to locate here in 1947 and the founder of Pakistan Muhammad Ali Jinnah was asked to lay the foundation stone of it.

 One of the international companies, for example, located at SITE Karachi is Exide Pakistan Limited which manufactures and markets automotive batteries.
 Many other companies located here represent business sectors such as food products, chemicals, heavy and light engineering workshops, plastic, rubber, leather products, repair and maintenance of motor vehicles and their assembly, woodworking, glass products and storage warehouses.

See also
 SITE Town
 Nooriabad

References

External links
 Sindh Industrial and Trading Estate Limited - official website

Industry in Pakistan
Economy of Sindh
1946 establishments in British India
SITE Town